is a Japanese ski jumper. He competed at the 1984 Winter Olympics and the 1988 Winter Olympics.

References

1962 births
Living people
Japanese male ski jumpers
Olympic ski jumpers of Japan
Ski jumpers at the 1984 Winter Olympics
Ski jumpers at the 1988 Winter Olympics
Sportspeople from Hokkaido